Trần Trọng Vũ (Hanoi, 1964) is a Vietnamese painter. He is the youngest son of the poet Trần Dần.

References

Vietnamese painters
1964 births
Living people
Date of birth missing (living people)